Loughborough Meadows is a  biological Site of Special Scientific Interest on the northern outskirts of Loughborough in Leicestershire, England.

This is the largest area of unimproved alluvial flood meadow in the county, and wet areas are dominated by creeping bent and marsh foxtail. A brook has large areas of marsh foxtail, and there is a field with breeding lapwings and redshanks.

There is public access to the site.

References

Leicestershire and Rutland Wildlife Trust
Sites of Special Scientific Interest in Leicestershire